Gösta Dunker (September 16, 1905 - June 5, 1973) was a Swedish footballer from who participated in 1934 FIFA World Cup, scoring one goal in the game versus Germany.

Dunker spent most of his career in Sandvikens IF.  In 1948-1950 he was a coach of Örebro SK.

References 

 Gosta DUNKER. Fifa.com. Retrieved 12 June 2009.
 "1934 FIFA World Cup Italy - Match Report Germany - Sweden".Fifa.com. Retrieved 12 June 2009.

1905 births
1973 deaths
Swedish footballers
Sweden international footballers
Allsvenskan players
Swedish football managers
Örebro SK managers
1934 FIFA World Cup players
Association football forwards
Sandvikens IF players
People from Sandviken Municipality
Sportspeople from Gävleborg County